Club Baloncesto Benicarló, is a professional basketball team based in Benicarló, Valencian Community, that currently plays in LEB Plata.

History
1969 is considered the year of foundation of the club as it was the year when Club Baloncesto OJE, the first team in the city, was registered. After playing since its foundation in the third division, the club promotes for the first time ever in 1987.

In 2018 the club is selected to cover a vacant place in Liga EBA. After a first season where the club qualified to the final stage and failed to promote to LEB Plata in the repechage match, Benicarló achieves a spot for playing in the league.

Season by season

Current roster

References

External links
Official Page

Basketball teams established in 1984
Basketball teams in the Valencian Community
LEB Plata teams
Former Liga EBA teams
Province of Castellón